Stephen "Steve" Feraday (born April 5, 1959 in Toronto, Ontario) is a retired track and field athlete from Canada, who competed in the men's javelin throw event during his career.  A member of the University of Toronto athletics club, Feraday represented his native country at two consecutive Summer Olympics, beginning with Seoul. Feraday threw his personal record 77.82 in 1988.

Achievements

References

External links
 
 
 
 
 

1959 births
Living people
Athletes (track and field) at the 1988 Summer Olympics
Athletes (track and field) at the 1990 Commonwealth Games
Athletes (track and field) at the 1991 Pan American Games
Athletes (track and field) at the 1992 Summer Olympics
Athletes from Toronto
Canadian male javelin throwers
Olympic track and field athletes of Canada
Commonwealth Games competitors for Canada
Pan American Games track and field athletes for Canada
Track and field athletes from Ontario
University of Toronto alumni
World Athletics Championships athletes for Canada
20th-century Canadian people
21st-century Canadian people